Aaron Lane Ford (December 21, 1903 – July 8, 1983) was a U.S. Representative from Mississippi.

Born in Potts Camp, Mississippi, Ford attended public schools in Mississippi and Cumberland School of Law at Cumberland University, Lebanon, Tennessee.
He was admitted to the bar in 1927 and commenced practice in Aberdeen, Mississippi.
He moved to Ackerman, Mississippi, the same year and continued the practice of law.
He served as district attorney of the fifth circuit court district 1932-1934.

Ford was elected as a Democrat to the Seventy-fourth and to the three succeeding Congresses (January 3, 1935 – January 3, 1943).
He was an unsuccessful candidate for renomination in 1942 to the Seventy-eighth Congress.
He served as delegate to the Inter-Parliamentary Union conference at The Hague, Netherlands, in 1938.
He resumed the practice of law in Washington, D.C., and Jackson, Mississippi.
He was a resident of Jackson, Mississippi, until his death there July 8, 1983.
He was interred in Rosedale Cemetery, Cuthbert, Georgia.

References

1903 births
1983 deaths
Democratic Party members of the United States House of Representatives from Mississippi
Freed–Hardeman University
Cumberland School of Law alumni
People from Marshall County, Mississippi
Politicians from Jackson, Mississippi
20th-century American politicians
Lawyers from Jackson, Mississippi
People from Aberdeen, Mississippi
People from Ackerman, Mississippi
20th-century American lawyers